Lackey is a surname. 

People bearing it include:
Robert Lackey (fl. 1891), American football coach
John Lackey (politician) (1830–1903), New South Wales politician and magistrate
William Lackey (1870–1941), American baseball pitcher for the Philadelphia Athletics
Edwin Lackey (1930–1993), Canadian Anglican bishop
Ken Lackey (born 1943), American businessman and politician from Oklahoma
Robert T. Lackey (born 1944), Canadian born fisheries scientist
Bob Lackey (1949–2002), American basketball player
Douglas P. Lackey (fl. since 1970s), American philosopher and playwright
Mercedes Lackey (born 1950), American author of fantasy novels
Brad Lackey (born 1953), American motocross racer
Tom Lackey (born 1959), American politician, serving in the California state legislature
Brenda Bakken-Lackey (fl. 1999–2006), Canadian politician serving in the Saskatchewan legislative assembly
Gavin Lackey (born 1968), Australian modern pentathlete
Lisa Lackey (born 1971), Australian actress
Jennifer Lackey (born c. 1970s), American professor of philosophy
John Lackey (born 1978), American baseball pitcher for the Chicago Cubs
Ryan Lackey (born 1979), American entrepreneur and computer security professional
Stephen N. Lackey (born 1980), American public affairs advisor, philanthropist and political fundraiser 
Kaysie Lackey (born 1981), American food artist
Andrew Lackey (1983–2013), American convicted murderer
Tamara Lackey, American photographer